Standart may refer to:

People
 Frank W. Standart (1871–1941), American lawyer and politician
 Joseph G. Standart (1834–1912), American hardware businessman in Detroit

Other
 an alternative translation of Штандартъ, the Russian name of the ship  Shtandart 
 Standart (Heraldic flag),  the Russian Regimental colors
 Shtandart (frigate, 1703), a Russian sailing frigate constructed in 1703–1730 and recreated in 1999
 Standart (newspaper), a Bulgarian newspaper
 StandArt, album of jazz standards by pianist Tigran Hamasyan
 Standart (magazine), print magazine about specialty coffee culture
 Standart (yacht), an Imperial Russian yacht serving Nicholas II and his family
 Standart Yacht (Fabergé egg), a jeweled egg created by the House of Fabergé
 Standarts, a series of paintings and sculptures made by German artist A. R. Penck

See also
Standard (disambiguation)